Escolca, Iscroca in sardinian language, is a comune (municipality) in the Province of South Sardinia in the Italian region Sardinia, located about  north of Cagliari.

The municipality of Escolca contains the frazione (subdivision) San Simone.

Escolca borders the following municipalities: Barumini, Gergei, Gesico, Mandas, Serri, Villanovafranca.

Demographic evolution

References 

Cities and towns in Sardinia